Euriphene canui is a butterfly in the family Nymphalidae. It is found on Bioko, an island off the west coast of Africa.

References

External links
Type images at Royal Museum for Central Africa

Butterflies described in 1987
Euriphene
Endemic fauna of Equatorial Guinea
Butterflies of Africa